Magicicada tredecula is a species of periodical cicada in the family Cicadidae. It is endemic to the United States. As its specific epithet implies, they emerge as adults once every thirteen years.

Life Cycle
Their median life cycle from egg to natural adult death is around thirteen years. However, their life cycle can range from nine years to seventeen years.

References

Insects of the United States
Insects described in 1962
Lamotialnini